was a travel documentary series, produced by Japanese public broadcaster NHK and broadcast on television, both nationally and internationally by NHK's networks. A live relay from China aired every Sunday at 12:00pm, followed by a 10-minute digest edition - a new edition airing Monday through Friday at 12:00pm. The host of the program was Tomohiro Sekiguchi, an actor by profession.

Concept 
Sekiguchi takes on the challenge of traveling 36,000 kilometers (about 22,369 miles) by railway throughout China. The path was designed by computer software, such that the route is an unbroken line, and not a single part of the route crosses another part of the same route.

The trip is broken into two editions: Spring and Fall. In the Spring edition, Sekiguchi's trip begins by flying from Japan to Lhasa in Tibet, and ends in Xian - with a distance of 17,000 km. The Fall edition continues the journey, and ends with a combined 36,000 km traveled.

Japanese television series
NHK original programming